This is a list of the Los Premios MTV Latinoamérica winners and nominees for Best Video Game Soundtrack.

Latin American music awards
Latin American music
MTV Video Music Awards